CCNR could mean:

Central Commission for Navigation on the Rhine
China CNR, a national rail rolling stock manufacturer, before a merger created CRRC 
Center for Complex Network Research at Northeastern University
Canadian Coalition for Nuclear Responsibility, see Anti-nuclear movement in Canada
Coca-Cola and Nestle Refreshments, the previous name of Beverage Partners Worldwide